These are the results for the Team jumping event at the 2018 Summer Youth Olympics.

Schedule 
All times are local (UTC−3).

Results

References

External links
Round 1
Round 2
Jump-off

Equestrian at the 2018 Summer Youth Olympics